The 1972 Campeonato Brasileiro Série A (officially the Segundo Campeonato Brasileiro de Clubes) was the 16th edition of the Campeonato Brasileiro Série A.

Overview
The championship had 26 teams, and Palmeiras won the championship. The championship had four phases.

The First Phase saw the twenty-six teams divided into four groups: two groups of six, and two groups of seven. Despite being divided into groups, the phase was contested in a single round-robin format, with each team playing the others once. The top four teams in each group advanced to the Second Phase.
The Second Phase saw the sixteen qualified teams divided into four groups of four. The teams within each group played each other in a single round-robin format. The top team from each group advanced to the Semifinals.
The Semifinals were played in the form of knockout tournament, in which the winner of the match advanced to the finals. In case of a draw, the team with the best record on the championship advanced.
The Finals were disputed using the same rules of the semifinals.

First phase

Group A

Group B

Group C

Group D

Second phase

Group 1

Group 2

Group 3

Group 4

Semifinals

Finals

Final standings

References
 1972 Campeonato Brasileiro Série A at RSSSF

1972
1
Bra
B